WLFJ-FM (89.3 MHz) is a non-commercial radio station, licensed to Greenville, North Carolina, and serving the Upstate, including Spartanburg, Anderson and Clemson.  Owned by the Radio Training Network, it broadcasts a Contemporary Christian music format, known as "His Radio 89.3."  Several Christian talk and teaching shows are also included in the weekday schedule, hosted by Jim Daly, David Jeremiah and Charles Stanley.

WLFJ-FM has an effective radiated power (ERP) of 41,000 watts (horizontal) and 37,000 watts (vertical).  The transmitter is on Tower Road in Travelers Rest, South Carolina.

HD Radio
WLFJ-FM broadcasts in the HD Radio format. 
HD2 carries His Radio Z, a youth-oriented Christian CHR format; it is syndicated from the First Baptist Church of Spartanburg's WHRZ-LP.  
HD3 carries His Radio Praise, a contemporary worship music format. It is also available on FM via 103.9 WSHP-FM Easley and 89.7 W209CM-Simpsonville. The main channel simulcasts His Radio Praise from 8 am to 12 noon on Sunday mornings.
HD4 carries His Radio Talk, which airs talk and teaching programming. It is available on FM via 91.9 WHRT-FM Cokesbury, and the translator 92.9 W225AZ. Under a local marketing agreement, it was also heard on iHeartMedia's daytimer WLFJ 660 AM, but this arrangement ended in August 2019.

Translators
In addition to the main station, WLFJ-FM is simulcast on 94.1 WGFJ in Cross Hill, South Carolina, which serves the western portion of the Upstate. It also operates 10 FM translators that bring the signal into portions of the Atlanta, Asheville and Charlotte radio markets.

Additionally, 91.3 WLFA in Asheville, North Carolina; 92.1 WCFJ in Columbia, South Carolina, and 88.5 WRTP in Raleigh, North Carolina,  call themselves "His Radio" and air many of the same programs as WLFJ.

References

External links

Radio stations established in 1983
1983 establishments in South Carolina
Greenville, South Carolina
LFJ-FM